Kellyville is a suburb of Sydney, in the state of New South Wales, Australia 36 kilometres north-west of the Sydney central business district in the local government area of The Hills Shire. It is part of the Hills District region.

History

Kellyville is believed to be named after Hugh Kelly, who owned land comprising the Kellyville Estate.

Kelly owned a hotel on the corner of Wrights and Windsor Roads called the Bird-In-Hand. Kellyville's origins as a landmark date to at least 1810 with the grant of land and the 1820s construction of the White Hart Inn. The foundations for the Inn remain. The Inn was a popular stable and accommodation on the main road to Windsor. The White Hart Inn existed long prior to its competitor The Bird In Hand. Ironically, the original owner of the land grant on which the White Hart Hotel was built was Hugh Kelly. The NW Rail Line has conducted extensive archaeological research on the site and documented the history of the Inn including information about Hugh Kelly.  Originally, the area had been known as 'There and Nowhere' followed by 'Irish Town' for the clan of Kellys that lived in the area. Kelly died in 1884 a respected local. Following his death, John Fitzgerald Burns, James Green, George Withers, Tiger Lilly, and Adam and Stephanie Corbishley (who went on to be divorced) purchased portions of several early land grants, which were subdivided into farmlets as part of the 'Kellyville Estate', thereby giving the suburb its name. Their original land boundaries explain the present route of Windsor Road. The first subdivisions of  lots were made in 1884.

Kellyville Post Office opened on 1 January 1889. The original post office building stands on the corner of Acres Road and Windsor Roads. It now houses a car rental operation.

Parts of Kellyville have become separate suburbs over the years. Beaumont Hills, north of Samantha Riley Drive, was renamed in 2002. Kellyville Ridge, west of Old Windsor Road, is a separate suburb in the City of Blacktown. North Kellyville was proclaimed a separate suburb in June 2018.

Kellyville Public School is a historic building which was established in 1873. For most of the 20th century, Kellyville was semi-rural. From the 1960s to the 1980s about 900 homes were developed in an area around Acres Road, known locally as 'The Village'. Major developments such as Kellyville Plaza have encouraged residential growth. Due to the suburb's location, Kellyville is a major growth area in The Hills.

Commercial areas
Kellyville Village (formerly Kellyville Plaza) located on Wrights Road, features a Coles supermarket and 38 speciality stores with services, groceries and fashion. The centre and Woolworths supermarket next door both opened in 2003. Other shopping needs are met by the various shops located on a light commercial strip in an area known as 'The Village' on Windsor Road, Kellyville. Kellyville Pets, on Windsor Road, is a large and diverse pet store.

In 2014, an Aldi supermarket opened on land next door to Kellyville Village on Wrights Road. In 2015, an expansion of Kellyville Village opened with a larger Coles Megastore, First Choice Liquor, Kmart Tyre & Auto Service, and an additional 16 speciality stores.

The newly opened North Kellyville Square located on the corner of Withers and Hezlett Roads to the north of the suburb provides a Woolworths and specialty stores to the area which is booming in population.

Residential areas
Kellyville possesses a  combination of semi-rural, older suburban and modern residences offering a variety of lifestyles, spanning from medium-density townhouse developments along Kellyville Shopping Plaza to opulent residences sited adjacent to natural creeks and bushlands. As a result of the suburb's strategic location, Kellyville offers a relaxed and quiet lifestyle being surrounded by rural areas and suburban Castle Hill, Baulkham Hills and Glenhaven.

Housing estates:
 Duncraig Estate (Cattai Creek Drive, north-east Kellyville) - Known for being a popular choice among home buyers due to both leafiness and diverse choice of house types, ranging from modest modern housing to large affluent properties. Residential land sizes range between 
 Highlands Estate (Wellgate Avenue, far-northern Kellyville area) - Renowned for being an upmarket neighbourhood surrounded by natural bushland and creek. Residential land sizes range between  
 Elizabeth Macarthur Estate (Macquarie Avenue, far-western Kellyville area). Noted for its easy access to Rouse Hill Town Centre, Stanhope Gardens and North-west T-way.
 Old Homeworld Display Village - Known as being originally the first 'New Homeworld', an estate of various display houses for aspiring brand new home buyers
 New Homeworld Display Village (Homeworld IV - River Oak Circuit, western Kellyville area). Billed as the largest display village in the world with 120 homes, it is a neighbourhood of display homes which are designed to encourage purchase of home construction. After being used as a display village, the houses are sold for normal residential occupancy. Residential land sizes range between

Education
Primary & secondary schools:
 Kellyville Public School - Public Primary School
 Sherwood Ridge Public School - Public Primary School
 St Angela's Primary School - Catholic Primary School
 Our Lady of the Rosary Primary School - Catholic Primary School
 Kellyville High School - Public High School
 William Clarke College - Private School for students from Kindergarten to Year 12
 Beaumont Hills Primary School - Public Primary School
 Australian International Academy (AIA) - Kindergarten to Year 12 International Baccalaureate school

Special needs schools:
 Tallowood School - School for disabled students from ages 4 to 18

Transport

Road

Windsor Road is a significant road linking Parramatta, in the City of Parramatta, with Windsor, in the City of Hawkesbury. Recent infrastructure development in the Hills District has increased the accessibility of Kellyville. Windsor Road, formerly one-lane each way, was upgraded to a two-lane road in 2006 and has significantly improved traffic flow in the area. Green Road was completed as a two-lane road in 2006 and links Kellyville with the nearby Victoria Avenue, Castle Hill trading zone 2 km down the road, home to three Homemaker centres, car dealers, light industrial areas and many other retail outlets. The old Glenhaven Bridge is a wooden, shared one-lane bridge and was replaced with the new Glenhaven Bridge, which is a proper concrete bridge suitable for heavy vehicles. Built in 2007, the bridge runs over Cattai Creek and allows for normal traffic flows between Kellyville and Glenhaven. An unorthodox bailey bridge (Circa ?) and former roadway have been retained in Golden Grove Reserve. This former road bridge can be found between James Mileham Dr and Geewan Ave in the reserve. This bridge once was the extension to Acres Road joining Hezlett Road.

Kellyville now has the advantage of faster travel to Sydney CBD fuelled by the Lane Cove Tunnel and the M2 Hills Motorway. In good conditions, travel takes approximately 35 minutes.

Bus and rail
Transport to Parramatta by bus in the far-western side of Kellyville has been improved through the development of the bus-only North-West T-Way, which runs parallel with Old Windsor Road.

Sport and recreation
The Bernie Mullane Sporting Complex is a major recreational facility which was officially opened in March 2003 with a total project cost of more than $13 million. As part of the project, an indoor facility for a gym and other indoor sports, tennis courts, soccer fields and cricket grounds were constructed. The complex provides for a wide range of indoor and outdoor health, recreational and sporting programs and services.

Other recreational venues include:
 Caddies Creek Reserve - Radisson Place
 Commercial Road Netball Reserve - Wellgate Avenue
 Kellyville Memorial Park - Memorial Avenue
 Macquarie Avenue Reserve - Macquarie Avenue
 The Hills Centenary Park - Cnr Commercial & Withers

Recreational facilities in close proximity include Castle Hill Country Club and Fred Caterson Reserve in Castle Hill. Fred Caterson Reserve is set within a 60 hectare bushland setting directly less than 1 km south-east of Kellyville, and offers a range of outdoor options including bushwalking tracks, BMX track, cycleways, remote control car track and many other sporting fields.

Demographics
Residents had a younger median age than the country overall: the median age was 35 years, compared to the national median of 38 years. Children aged under 15 years made up 24.3% of the population (national average is 18.7%) and people aged 65 years and over made up  8.9% of the population (national average is 15.7%). 61.0% of residents were born in Australia, the next most common countries of birth were India 4.2%, China 4.1%, England 3.0%, South Africa 2.2% and Philippines 2.0%. 64.3% of residents only spoke English at home. Other languages spoken at home included Mandarin 5.3%, Cantonese 2.5%, Hindi 2.3%, Arabic 2.0% and Persian 1.6%.

The most common responses for religion were Catholic 30.3%, No Religion 18.3% and Anglican 13.4%.

Notable residents
Some of Kellyville's notable residents include -
Maxine Beneba Clarke - award-winning author, poet and illustrator
Greg Page - former member of The Wiggles
 Anthony Field - member of The Wiggles
 Waqar Younis - former Pakistan cricketer
Ryan Papenhuyzen - NRL player

Issues

Environmental impact
Kellyville, as with other newer suburbs in both the south-west and north-west districts of Sydney, has been viewed in the media as a suburb of larger homes that are low-cost in design and mediocre in terms of build quality. Most of the newer homes are built at a high house-to-land ratio, resulting in small distances between neighbours, smaller backyards, and smaller setbacks. With less land and much larger floor plans (double what a typical house would cover), environmental impact is a concern. More trees are planted to offer natural shade from extreme summer heat and more energy is needed to run air-conditioners and heaters.

Public transport deficiency
The deficiency of public transport in the area is often criticised. Due to low density planning the bus service within many of the suburbs is slow and infrequent. As a result, commuters to the city are forced either to drive through expensive and congested tollways or take buses which are almost always overcrowded. Transportation has significantly improved after the opening of the Sydney Metro North West line on 26 May 2019

Land release

Over the next decade, Kellyville will be further developed on remaining greenfield sites. These sites include northern Kellyville (adjoining Rouse Hill) and the Balmoral Road release area. Since 2013 following approval of the Nprth West Rail Line and the approved design there has been significant land release with construction now evident throughout these land release areas. The former "no man's land" between Glenwood (Windsor Rd), Windsor Road and Bella Vista is under construction with a blend of high and medium density development build adjacent to new railway stations, track works and siding facilities.

References

External links 

 History of Kellyville.

Suburbs of Sydney
The Hills Shire